Ulsberg is a village in the municipality of Rennebu in Trøndelag county, Norway. The village sits at the junction of the Norwegian National Road 3 and the European route E06 highway. The Dovrebanen railway line passes through the village.

References

Villages in Trøndelag
Rennebu